Franco Bellocq (born 15 October 1993) is an Argentine professional footballer who plays as a midfielder for Atlético de Rafaela.

Club career
Bellocq started in the youth ranks of Buenos Aires club Estudiantes, before joining the Independiente youth team in 2007. Six years later, Bellocq was promoted into Independiente's first-team and featured in the matchday squad for the first-time in May 2013 for a Copa Argentina match against Boca Unidos. He made his debut in Primera B Nacional on 27 February 2014 in a home loss to Atlético Tucumán. He went onto make nine more league appearances in 2013–14 as Independiente won promotion into the 2014 Argentine Primera División. In the subsequent two seasons, Bellocq made twenty-four league appearances.

On 10 January 2016, Bellocq joined fellow Primera División club Arsenal de Sarandí on loan until 2017. In total, he participated in thirty-one games in all competitions and scored four goals. In July 2017, Bellocq joined Olimpo on loan. His first appearance for Olimpo came on 30 October in a 1–1 draw with Defensa y Justicia. He returned to his parent club on 16 May 2018. Bellocq signed for Superleague Greece side Asteras Tripolis on 23 June.

On 12 August 2021, he signed with Taranto in the Italian third-tier Serie C.

On 6 February 2022, Bellocq returned to Argentina and signed with Atlético de Rafaela.

Career statistics
.

References

External links

1993 births
Living people
Argentine people of French descent
Sportspeople from Córdoba Province, Argentina
Argentine footballers
Association football midfielders
Club Atlético Independiente footballers
Arsenal de Sarandí footballers
Olimpo footballers
Asteras Tripolis F.C. players
Taranto F.C. 1927 players
Atlético de Rafaela footballers
Primera Nacional players
Argentine Primera División players
Super League Greece players
Serie C players
Argentine expatriate footballers
Expatriate footballers in Greece
Argentine expatriate sportspeople in Greece
Expatriate footballers in Italy
Argentine expatriate sportspeople in Italy